Badger Township may refer to the following townships in the US:

 Badger Township, Webster County, Iowa
 Badger Township, Polk County, Minnesota